Amiret El Fhoul  is a village and commune located in the Monastir Governorate, Tunisia, located 205 kilometres from Tunis. Population 4525 (2004).

References

Populated places in Monastir Governorate
Communes of Tunisia